Joseph Cotter may refer to:
 Joseph Henry Cotter (1872–1937), Canadian politician
 Joseph Bernard Cotter (1844–1909), American Roman Catholic bishop 
 Joseph Seamon Cotter Jr. (1895–1919), American playwright, author and poet
 Joseph Seamon Cotter Sr. (1861–1949), American poet, writer, playwright, and community leader
 Joe Cotter (1877–1944), British trade union leader